, known mononymously as wyvern, are a Japanese football club based in Kariya, Aichi. From 2023, the club will be playing in the Tōkai Adult Soccer League 1st division.

History
The club was founded on 2015 by Nobuo Nasu, starting to play from the District Leagues, as Wyvern FC. The club's name originates from a legendary two-leg winged dragon, the Wyvern, which appears in many different schools or athletic teams around the world as logos, or mascots. The club is said to accurately portray the aggressiveness of the dragons in their playing style, but in high spirits, as the team tends to show energetic and many goal-scoring displays.

The club played from 2015 to 2017 at the West Mikawa District League, before earning promotion for the Aichi Prefectural League. Back-to-back promotions from the 3rd to the 1st division of the prefecture saw them quickly win promotion to the Regional Leagues. In the meantime, the club won the Kariya Prefectural Cup on 2019, while being a 2nd division club at the prefecture league system. 

Starting from the 2nd regional division on 2021, their campaign was cut short by the season cancellation, after COVID-19 forced multiple match postponements during the season. As the Japanese football could resume for the first time in three year under the reduced COVID-19 threat, the club was able to make an nearly unbeaten run in the two major competitions the club played in. At the 2022, they won 46 out of 48 possible points, having won their first 14 consecutive matches during the league season, having only failed to win a match on the penultimate league round against Nagoya SC in a 1–1 draw. Nevertheless, with a 12-point gap off the runners-up, the club became 2nd division champions, and then were promoted to the 1st division. Wyvern came close to win the 2022 edition of the Kariya Prefectural Cup, having lost the final on penalty shoot-outs against FC Kariya.

Stadiums 
They use four different facilities to train. UB Kariya Highway Soccer/Futsal Field (Toyota); UB Tokai Futsal Club (Toyota); Minato Aquilles UB Futsal Field (Nagoya); and UB Creative Base (Kariya). 

During the 2022 season, however, the club used two different venues to host their home matches at the Tokai Soccer League 2nd Division: Nagoya Minato Stadium (Nagoya) and Green Ground Kariya (Kariya).

League and cup record

Source: WYVERN Game Record
Key
 Pos. = Position in league; GP = Games played; W = Games won; D = Games drawn; L = Games lost; F = Goals scored; A = Goals conceded; GD = Goals difference; Pts = Points gained

Honours
League
Tōkai Adult Soccer League Division 2
Champions: 2022
Aichi Prefectural Soccer League Division 1
Champions: 2020
Aichi Prefectural Soccer League Division 2
Champions: 2019
Aichi Prefectural Soccer League Division 3
Champions: 2018
West Mikawa Soccer League Division 1
Champions: 2017
West Mikawa Soccer League Division 2
Champions: 2015

Cup
Kariya Prefectural Soccer Tournament
Champions: 2019
Aichi Prefectural Soccer Tournament Preliminaries
Champions: 2016

Current squad
, squad for the 2022 season.

Club officials

Managerial history

References

External links 
 Official Website 

Football clubs in Japan
Sports teams in Aichi Prefecture
Kariya, Aichi
Association football clubs established in 2015
2015 establishments in Japan